Bülent İplikçioğlu (born 1952 Afyonkarahisar, Turkey), is Turkish historian, epigrapher and professor of ancient history at the Marmara University in Istanbul.

İplikçioğlu studied History, Ancient History, Classics and Archaeology at the universities of Ankara and Vienna in the years 1970–1982. In Vienna, he received his PhD with a thesis on “Die Repräsentanten des senatorischen Reichsdienstes in Asia bis Diokletian im Spiegel der ephesischen Inschriften” in 1982. Until 1984, he was a university assistant to the Chair of Ancient History at the University of Ankara, from 1984 to 1986 an assistant professor in the Department of Ancient History at the Marmara University in Istanbul, where he became an associate professor in 1986 and professor of Ancient History in 1992.

İplikçioğlu is mainly interested in the history and epigraphy of ancient Asia Minor. From 1976 to 1991, he participated as an epigrapher in the excavations of the Austrian Archaeological Institute in Ephesus, and conducts his own epigraphic projects in the southwest of Turkey (Lycia and Pamphylia) on behalf of the Austrian Academy of Sciences since 1989.

He is a member of the German and Austrian Archaeological Institutes. Since 1984, İplikçioğlu is the head of the Department of Ancient History at the Marmara University, and holds lectures and seminars on Greco-Roman Antiquity, History of Asia Minor in the Hellenistic-Roman Period, Greek Epigraphy of Asia Minor and Methodology of Ancient History as well as cares of master's and doctoral theses.

Primary works 

 Die Repräsentanten des senatorischen Reichsdienstes in Asia bis Diokletian im Spiegel der ephesischen Inschriften, Wien: VWGÖ 1983.
 Ephesos im Spiegel seiner Inschriften, Wien: Schindler 1984 (with D. Knibbe).
 Epigraphische Forschungen in Termessos und seinem Territorium I, Wien: Österreichische Akademie der Wissenschaften 1991.
 Epigraphische Forschungen in Termessos und seinem Territorium II, Wien: Österreichische Akademie der Wissenschaften 1992.
 Neue Inschriften aus Nord-Lykien I, Wien: Österreichische Akademie der Wissenschaften 1992.
 Der Ritterstand und seine Tätigkeit im kaiserlichen Reichsdienst in Asia bis auf Diokletian im Spiegel der ephesischen Inschriften, Ankara: TTK 1993.
 Epigraphische Forschungen in Termessos und seinem Territorium III, Wien: Österreichische Akademie der Wissenschaften 1994.
 Eskibatı Tarihi I: Giriş, Kaynaklar, Bibliyografya, Ankara: TTK 1997.
 Hellen ve Roma Tarihinin Anahatları, İstanbul: Arkeoloji ve Sanat 2007
 Epigraphische Forschungen in Termessos und seinem Territorium IV, Wien: Österreichische Akademie der Wissenschaften 2007.

References

External links

 

20th-century Turkish historians
1952 births
Living people
People from Afyonkarahisar
Epigraphers
Academic staff of Ankara University
Ankara University alumni
University of Vienna alumni
Academic staff of the University of Vienna
Academic staff of Marmara University
21st-century Turkish historians